The 1997–98 United Hockey League season was the seventh season of the United Hockey League (the Colonial Hockey League before 1997), a North American minor professional league. Ten teams participated in the regular season and the Quad City Mallards won the league title.

Regular season

Colonial Cup-Playoffs

External links
 Season 1997/98 on hockeydb.com 

United Hockey League seasons
UHL
UHL